Frank McLeod Kirwan (23 October 1937 – 28 October 1976) was an Australian politician. Born in Norseman, Western Australia, he was educated at state schools and the School of Mines in Norseman, Western Australia, after which he became an electrical fitter. He was an official with the Electrical Trades Union and was also a Methodist minister.

In 1969, he was elected to the Australian House of Representatives as the Labor member for Forrest, defeating Liberal minister Gordon Freeth. He was only the second Labor member ever to win the seat. His victory was part of an 18-seat swing that nearly made Labor's Gough Whitlam Prime Minister.

He held the seat until his defeat in 1972 by Liberal Peter Drummond, even as Labor finally ended 23 years of Coalition rule.

Death
Kirwan died in Wooroloo in 1976.

References

1937 births
1976 deaths
Australian Methodists
Australian Labor Party members of the Parliament of Australia
Members of the Australian House of Representatives for Forrest
Members of the Australian House of Representatives
People from Norseman, Western Australia
Place of death missing
20th-century Australian politicians